The Environmental Protection Administration, Executive Yuan (EPA) is a cabinet-level executive agency responsible for protecting and conserving the environment in the Republic of China (Taiwan). This also includes, air quality, noise control, monitoring and inspection of environment, solid waste, recycling, sustainable development and international cooperation.

It is led by the Minister for Environment. He is supported by two deputy ministers.

History
The environmental protection agency has evolved and been part of different departments over decades. Prior to 1971, the environmental portfolio was part of the Ministry of Interior which encompasses the Health portfolio.

From March 1971 to 28 January 1982, the Department of Environmental Health was established to look after protecting the environment. Various agencies such as the Department of Health and others managed the soil and water aspects of environment.

From 29 January 1982 to 21 August 1987, the Environmental Protection Bureau was established to take over responsibility for noise and traffic control, air, water, waste management, health responsibilities under the Department of Health.

From 22 August 1987 to the present, the Environmental Protection Administration was established becoming the one stop shop for all environmental policies, regulation, standards and enforcement. It encompassed toxic substance management, environmental sanitation and monitoring and inspection of the environment.

In May 2022, the Executive Yuan approved the proposal to update the agency to become a ministry named Ministry of Environment and Natural Resources.

Department Structure

First Tier
Office of Chief Secretary
Office of Minister
Office of Sustainable Development
Greenhouse Gases Reduction Management Office
Office of Energy and Resource Program
Office of National Clear up Program

Second Tier
Department of Comprehensive Planning
Department of Air Quality Protection and Noise Control
Department of Water Quality Protection
Department of Waste Management
Department of Environmental Sanitation & Toxis Substance Management
Department of Supervision Evaluation & Dispute Resolution
Department of Environmental Monitoring and Information Management
Bureau of Environmental Inspection
Air Pollution Control Fund Management Board
Recycling Fund Management Board
Soil and Groundwater Remediation Fund Management Board
Environmental Analysis Laboratory
Environmental Professionals Training Institute

Third Tier
Offices of Personnel, Accounting, Civil Service Ethics, Statistics and Secretariat
Committees for Legal Affairs, Petitions and Appeals
Public Nuisance Arbitration

Fourth Tier
Environmental Police Unit
Local Environmental Agencies

Ministers

Transportation
The EPA building is accessible within walking distance South of Ximen MRT station of the Taipei Metro.

See also
 Environmental issues in Taiwan
 Executive Yuan
 Biotechnology
 Nitrogen cycle
 Soil science
 Water cycle
 Atmospheric sciences
 Numerical weather prediction
 National Space Organization
 Pollution
 Sewage treatment
 Demographics of Taiwan
 Water security
 Food security
 Show house
 Energy security
 History of Taiwan
 Economy of Taiwan

References

External links

Environmental Protection Administration 
Environmental Protection Administration at Flickr

1971 establishments in Taiwan
Executive Yuan
Environment of Taiwan
Environmental agencies
Government agencies established in 1971